Emil Wolff (1802–1879) was a 19th-century German sculptor and occasional artist in oil paints.

He is well-represented in galleries across Europe.

Life
He was born in Berlin on 2 March 1802. From 1815 he studied at the Prussian Academy of Arts in Berlin. He won a scholarship to study in Rome in 1822 under Bertel Thorwaldsen.

In 1854 King Friedrich Wilhelm IV purchased "Najade" for erection at Sanssouci. This was removed in 1985 due to erosion but replaced with a replica in 2017.

In 1865 he exhibited at the Dublin International Exhibition.

He died in Rome on 29 September 1879.

Family

His maternal uncle was the sculptor Johann Gottfried Schadow.

Works
see etc
Midas as a Judge (1825)
Charitas (1830)
The Night (1830)
Telephos suckled by the Doe
Hebe and Ganymede (1834)
Diana after the Hunt (1838)
The Amazons
Prometheus (1844)
Jephtha and his Daughter (1858)
Psyche after Amor's Escape
Judith (1868)
Bertel Thorwaldsen
The Tambourine Beater
Johann Winckelmann
Barthold Georg Niebuhr
Giovanni Pierluigi da Palestrina
Hermes
Youthful Satyr
Young Bacchus

References

1802 births
1879 deaths
Artists from Berlin
German sculptors